Hwarang, also known as Hwarang Corps, and Flowering Knights, were an elite warrior group of male youth in Silla, an ancient kingdom of the Korean Peninsula that lasted until the 10th century. There were educational institutions as well as social clubs where members gathered for all aspects of study, originally for arts and culture as well as religious teachings stemming mainly from Korean Buddhism. Chinese sources referred only to the physical beauty of the "Flower Youths". The history of the hwarang was not widely known until after the National Liberation Day of Korea in 1945, after which the hwarang became elevated to a symbolic importance.

The Hwarang were also referred to as Hyangdo ("fragrant ones" or "fragrant disciples" – 향도; 香徒), the word hwarang and its colloquial derivatives being used for everything from playboy to shaman or husband of a female shaman. The word remained in common use until the 12th century but with more derogatory connotations.

Traditional sources for Hwarang
Information on the Hwarang are mainly found in the historiographical works Samguk Sagi (1145) and Samgungnyusa (c. 1285), and the partially extant Haedong Goseungjeon (1215), a compilation of biographies of famous monks of the Three Kingdoms of Korea.

All three of these works cite primary sources no longer existent, including 1) a memorial stele to Nallang (presumably a Hwarang based upon the suffix nang) by the 9th–10th century Silla scholar Choe Chiwon; 2) an early Tang account of Silla titled the Xinluo guoji by the Tang official Ling Hucheng; and 3) Hwarang Segi (Chronicle of the Hwarang) by Kim Dae-mun, compiled in the early eighth century. In the late 1980s, an alleged Hwarang Segi manuscript was discovered in Gimhae, South Korea. Scholar Richard McBride regards it as a forgery.

History

Wonhwa
According to the Samguk Sagi and Samgungnyusa, two groups of women called Wonhwa  ("original flowers") preceded the Hwarang. The precise nature and activities of the Wonhwa are also unclear, with some scholars positing they may have actually been court beauties or courtesans. However, considering that they were trained in ethics, this may be a later patriarchal reading into the Wonhwa. Women played a much more prominent social role in pre-Joseon Korea, especially in Silla, which had three reigning queens in its history.

Both sources record that during the reign of Jinheung of Silla, groups of beautiful girls were chosen and taught filial and fraternal piety, loyalty, and sincerity (no firm date is given for this, and some scholars express doubt this even occurred during Jinheung's reign). However, the leaders of the two bands of Wonhwa, Nammo (南毛) and Junjeong (俊貞), grew jealous of one another. When Junjeong murdered her rival, the Wonhwa were disbanded. No doubt the details of this origin story are most likely based on myth and legend, despite the facts surrounding the foundation of the sect being true, as supported by various documented sources. First note that the term wonhwa is composed of won 源, "source", and undoubtedly refers to the founders of the sect, while hwa 花, "flower", is a euphemism for someone who has spent a great deal of time or money in the pursuit of something, i.e. a devotee. In the case of the Wonhwa, devotion to philosophy and the arts. Furthermore, while the names nammo and junjeong could have been appellations adopted by these two ladies for use in court, one cannot overlook the obvious descriptions they portray. Nammo hints at one who is careless yet lucky, or perhaps someone who is innately insightful and therefore lackadaisical about further erudition. Junjeung clearly indicates a person who is talented and virtuous, despite the fact that she was the one who succumbed to homicidal tendencies. It would be logical to assume that if someone had to work hard, maybe even struggle with attaining certain goals, that envy might consume them if their counterpart, especially if viewed more as a rival, seemed to reach the same objectives with substantially less effort.

Origins of the Hwarang
Although some historians believe that the Hwarang played a big part in the unification of the Three Kingdoms, some historians are unclear about the role that the Hwarang played in the unification;  An excerpt about Sadaham in the Samguk Sagi . According to the Samguk Yusa, the Silla king, "concerned about the strengthening of the country ... again issued a decree and chose boys from good families who were of good morals and renamed them hwarang."  The actual word used in this chronicle is hwanang (花娘), meaning "flower girls". This suggests that the Hwarang were not originally military in character, as the Wonhwa were not soldiers. 

The youths who were chosen by the Silla Kingdom became the knights and warriors for the Silla dynasty within the age of the Three Kingdoms of Korea.  A close relationship did exist between the Hwarang and Buddhism because Buddhism was accepted as a state religion by the royalty and aristocrats within the Silla Kingdom. The Buddhist monks were often mentors for the Hwarang in both physical and spiritual ways. The Hwarang would seek the teachings of these Buddhist monks because they knew that the martial arts practiced by these Buddhist monks were a source through which they could strengthen themselves for greater success in the future and for the benefit of the Silla Kingdom. The monks would train themselves in physical fitness exercises through self-defense techniques, countering the weakening effects of long-term meditation and enabling them to protect themselves from bandits and robbers who tried to steal the donations and charities that were collected by the monks on their pilgrimages. Both the Buddhist monks and the Hwarang would go on journeys to famous mountains to heighten their training and would seek encounters with supernatural beings for protection and the success/prosperous of the Silla Kingdom. Won Gwang Beop Sa (圓光法士) was a Buddhist monk who was asked by the Hwarang to teach them ways to develop aspirations, bravery, and honor, in order to protect the Silla Kingdom from the other kingdoms inhabiting the peninsula. Won Gwang trained these youths in three areas:

 Self-defense capabilities 
 Self-confidence 
 Self-control

Won Gwang taught the youths of the Hwarang to become warriors who could defend their beliefs with martial arts, to be confident in their actions, and to control themselves and their surroundings. Won Gwang gave to these Hwarang teachings in gwonbeop (martial methods or skills) that combined the secret Buddhist monk's physical and mental exercises.  Won Gwang also proposed 5 principles or guidelines that were later called the Five Precepts for Secular Life (Se Sok O Gye; 세속오계; 世俗五戒) which became a list of ethics that the Hwarang could embrace (this is why he is commonly known as Beop Sa or  "lawgiver"):

 Show allegiance to one's sovereign. (sa·gun·i·chung; 사군이충; 事君以忠)
 Treat one's parents with respect and devotion. (sa·chin·i·hyo; 사친이효; 事親以孝)
 Exhibit trust and sincerity amongst friends. (gyo·u·i·sin; 교우이신; 交友以信)
 Never retreat in battle. (im·jeon·mu·toe; 임전무퇴; 臨戰無退)
 Exercise discretion when taking a life. (sal·saeng·yu·taek; 살생유택; 殺生有擇)

These commandments and teachings of Won Gwang were followed by the Hwarang to protect the Silla Kingdom from rival kingdoms and helped unify the nation of Ancient Korea until the fall of the Silla Kingdom.

In 520, King Beopheung had instituted Sino-Korean style reforms and formalized the golpum (bone rank) system. In 527, Silla formally adopted Buddhism as a state religion. The establishment of Hwarang took place in the context of tightening central state control, a complement to the golpum system and a symbol of harmony and compromise between the king and the aristocracy.

Evolution
With the consolidation and expansion of Silla and intensification of military rivalries among the Three Kingdoms in the 6th century, the Silla court took a more active interest in the Hwarang. Hwarang groups were usually led by a youth of aristocratic standing, and the state appointed a high-ranking official to oversee the organization.

The Hwarang in the later 6th and 7th centuries trained in horsemanship, swordsmanship, archery, javelin and stone throwing, polo, and ladder-climbing.  By the seventh century the organization had grown greatly in prestige and numbered several hundred bands.

The Samguk Sagi, compiled by the general and official Gim Busik, emphasizes the military exploits of certain Hwarang, while the Samgungnyusa emphasizes the group's Buddhist activities. The biographies section of the Samguk Sagi describes young Hwarang who distinguished themselves in the struggles against the Gaya confederacy and later Baekje and Goguryeo. According to the Hwarang Segi, as cited in the Samguk Sagi and Haedong Goseungjeon, “...able ministers and loyal subjects are chosen from them, and good generals and brave soldiers are born therefrom.” 

The Hwarang were greatly influenced by Buddhist, Confucian, and Daoist ideals. A Chinese official recorded, "They [Silla] choose fair sons from noble families and deck them out with cosmetics and fine clothes and call them Hwarang. The people all revere and serve them."

Disbandment
After establishing a Unified Silla, the Silla-Tang War, and reestablishing relations with the Tang dynasty, the Hwarang lost much of their influence and prestige during peacetime. This group was reduced to a social club for Silla's elite through various names. They would eventually disappear after the fall of Silla, but they lasted through the Koryŏ dynasty until they officially disbanded at the beginning of the Joseon dynasty.

Hierarchy
 원화 – Wonhwa: Royal Female Patron (源花) (disbanded)
 풍월주 – Pungwolju: Head of the Hwarang (風月主)
 국선 – Gukseon: Chief Officer of a Hwarang group (國仙)
 원상화 – Wonsanghwa: First Officer in charge of martial arts training (原上花)
 상선- Sangseon: Training officers for the Hwarang (上仙)
 화랑도– Hwarang: Members of the Hwarang groups and leaders of the Nangdo (花郞)
 낭도 – Nangdo: Followers of the Hwarang (郎徒)

Historians have problems figuring out the leadership hierarchy within the Hwarang as they piece together different historical materials. For instance, historians thought the Pungwolju was a government position administering the Hwarang groups, a Hwarang leader, or a previous system within the Hwarang. Historians also dispute the Gukseon as Hwarang leaders appointed by the king or the Hwarang groups elect their members to lead their groups. Some historians believed the Pungwolju and Gukseon ranks might be synonymous with each other, and they both served as Hwarang leaders.

Five commandments
Two youths, Gwisan (귀산,貴山) and Chwihang (취항, 取項), approached the Silla monk Won Gwang (원광, 圓光) seeking spiritual guidance and teaching, saying, “We are ignorant and without knowledge. Please give us a maxim which will serve to instruct us for the rest of our lives.”

Won Gwang, who had gained fame for his period of study in Sui China, replied by composing the Sesok-ogye ("Five Commandments for Secular Life"; 세속 오계; 世俗五戒). These have since been attributed as a guiding ethos for the Hwarang:

Loyalty to one's lord (sagun ichung; 사군이충; 事君以忠; 나라에 충성하고)
Love and respect your parents (sachin ihyo; 사친이효; 事親以孝; 부모님께 효도하고)
Trust among friends (gyo-u isin; 교우이신; 交友以信; 믿음으로 벗을 사귀고)
Never retreat in battle (imjeon mutwae; 임전무퇴; 臨戰無退; 싸움에 나가서는 물러서지 않으며)
Never take a life without a just cause (salsaeng yutaek; 살생유택; 殺生有擇; 살아있는 것을 함부로 죽이지 않는다)

The Samguk Yusa also records that Hwarang members learned the Five Cardinal Confucian Virtues, the Six Arts, the Three Scholarly Occupations, and the Six Ways of Government Service (五常六藝 三師六正).

Famous Hwarang 
 Kim Yu-sin (김유신)
 Kim Alcheon (김알천)
 Gim Won-sul (김원술)
 Kim Gwanchang (김관창)

Other uses

Following the fall of Silla, the term hwarang survived and changed in meaning again.  In Choe Sejin (최세진)'s 1527 book Hunmong jahoe (훈몽자회), the term hwarang is even referred to as a male prostitute. Today, Hwarang is often used in the names of various schools, organizations and companies.

 The Taekwondo pattern Hwa-Rang as well as several traditional forms are named in honor of the Hwarang.
 A South Korean cigarette brand issued to the armed forces was called "Hwarang".
 Hwa Rang Do is a modern Korean martial art that is inspired by the ancient Hwarang warriors and their legacy.
 In the fighting game series Tekken, a playable character named Hwoarang is present in the game, and fights with the Tae Kwon Do fighting style.
 Grandmaster Ho Sik Pak named his martial arts federation the "Hwa Rang World Tang Soo Do Federation" in honor of the Hwarang.
 Silla"新羅 花郎徒" 興武大王·將軍 金庾信 Kim Yu-sin 後孫 a scion of a royal stock kim chul 實戰戰鬪護身術 創始者"Hosinsool.

In popular culture 
Hwarang: The Poet Warrior Youth (KBS2, 2016–2017)
Queen Seondeok (MBC, 2009)

See also
History of Korea
Wonhwa
Namsadang
Knight
Samurai
Shinsengumi
Shi (class)
Kheshig

Notes

References
Hong, Fang. and Gwang Ok. "Martial Arts in Asia: History, Culture, and Politics", Routledge, 2018.

Ikeuchi Hiroshi. "Shiragi no karō ni tsuite." Tōyō-gakuhō 24.1 (1936), pp. 1–34
Joe, Wanna J. and Hongkyu A. Choe. Traditional Korea, A Cultural History. Seoul: Hollym, 1997.
Lee, Ki-dong. "The Silla Society and Hwarang Corps." Journal of Social Sciences and Humanities, 65 (June 1987 ):1-16
Lee, Peter H. (trans.) Lives of Eminent Korean Monks: The Haedong Kosŭng Chŏn (by Gakhun). Cambridge, MA: Harvard University Press, 1969.
McBride, Richard D., II. "The Hwarang segi Manuscripts: An In-Progress Colonial Period Fiction." Korea Journal, vol. 45, no. 3 (Autumn 2005):230-260.
McBride, Richard D., II. "Silla Buddhism and the Hwarang." Korean Studies 34 (2010): 54–89.
Mohan, Pankaj N. “Maitreya Cult in Early Shilla: Focusing on Hwarang in Maitreya-Dynasty.” Seoul Journal of Korean Studies, 14 (2001):149-174.
Rutt, Richard. "The Flower Boys of Silla (Hwarang), Notes on the Sources." Transactions of the Korea Branch of the Royal Asiatic Society, 38 (October 1961):1-66.
Tikhonov, Vladimir. "Hwarang Organization: Its Functions and Ethics." Korea Journal, vol. 38, no. 2 (Summer 1998):318-338. 
Waley, A. "The Book of Songs" London, 1937.
McBride II, R. (n.d.). Retrieved 6 December 2014, from Silla Buddhism and the Hwarang segi Manuscripts. Korean Studies. (2007) Vol. 31 Issue 1, 19–38. 20p
McBride II, R. (n.d.). Retrieved 6 December 2014, from Silla Buddhism and the Hwarang. Korean Studies. Vol. 34 Issue 1. (2010) 54–89. 36p   
ACTA Black Belt Manual,. (2007). History of Tae Kwon Do. Retrieved 6 December 2014, from ACTA Black Belt Manual 
Hwarangkwan.org,. (2014). Kwan_Chang. Retrieved 6 December 2014, from http://www.hwarangkwan.org/kwan_chang.htm  
Shin, Chi-Yun. "Glossary of key terms". New York: New York University Press, 2005.

History of education in Korea
Korean warriors
Military history of Korea
Silla